BSC Lokomotiv Moscow is a professional beach soccer team associated with the soccer club FC Lokomotiv Moscow based in Moscow, Russia. Lokomotiv Moscow is a four-times Russian champion, four-times Russian Cup winner and the first holder of the Russian Super Cup in 2011. Internationally, Lokomotiv is the only Russian club to win the Mundialito de Clubes. The club won the inaugural 2013 Euro Winners Cup.

Current squad

Coach:  Alekandr Elizarov

Honours

International competitions

Mundialito de Clubes
 Winners (3): 2012, 2017, 2021
Euro Winners Cup
 Winners (1): 2013
Euro Challenge Cup
 Winners (1): 2019

Alanya Cup
 Winners (1): 2018

Eurasia Cup
 Winners (1): 2018

National competitions

Russian Championships
 Winners (5): 2010, 2011, 2012, 2017, 2020

Russian Cup
 Winners (4): 2011, 2012, 2013, 2016

Russian Super Cup
 Winners (1): 2011

Two Capitals Cup
 Third place (1): 2016

Victory Cup
 Winners (2): 2017, 2019

Moscow Championships
 Runners-up (1): 2018

Notable former players

  Ozu Moreira
  Ahmadzadeh
  Belchior
  Alan Cavalcanti
  Madjer
  Maci
  Bukhlitskiy
  Chuzhkov
  Filimonov
  Krasheninnikov
  Leonov
  Makarov
  Shkarin
  Shishin
  Shaykov
  Stankovic

References

External links
  
  Profile at bsrussia.ru
  Official vkontakte page

BSC
Russian beach soccer teams